Karl Philipp Moritz (Hameln, 15 September 1756 – Berlin, 26 June 1793) was a German author, editor and essayist of the Sturm und Drang, late Enlightenment, and classicist periods, influencing early German Romanticism as well. He led a life as a hatter's apprentice, teacher, journalist, literary critic, professor of art and linguistics, and member of both of Berlin's academies.

Biography
Moritz was born into impoverished circumstances in Hameln in 1756. After receiving a scanty schooling, he was apprenticed to a hat maker. After distressful attempts to gain a living, he caught the attention of a patron in Hanover and entered a gymnasium; however, he soon accepted an engagement as actor under Ekhof at Gotha, failing in which he returned to study (1776) at Erfurt; but tiring again he joined the Herrnhuter (Moravian Church) at Barby, and studied theology at Wittenberg (1777); then taught philanthropy at the Potsdam military orphanage, soon again to take to wandering.

Teaching in Berlin, he made a reputation as writer, preacher and poet, and went to England. Then he became professor at the gymnasium at Berlin. Next he tried editing the Vossische Zeitung to make it proletarian, but failed. Later he traveled to Italy (1786) where he met Goethe, and on his return to Germany he took up residence as Goethe's guest at Weimar. Duke Karl August helped him join the Berlin Academy of Sciences, and in 1789 Moritz became a professor of antiquities at the Royal Academy of Fine Arts in Berlin. Among his students were Ludwig Tieck, Wilhelm Heinrich Wackenroder and Alexander von Humboldt. He was an avid admirer of Jean Paul, and befriended Moses Mendelssohn, and Asmus Jakob Carstens.

Works
Apart from a four-part autobiographical novel, Anton Reiser, and two fictional Andreas Hartknopf novels, he also wrote a number of theoretical writings on aesthetics, especially "Über die bildende Nachahmung des Schönen" (On the Formative Imitation of Beauty), which Goethe excerpted in his Italian Journey. Moritz's Magazin zur Erfahrungsseelenkunde als ein Lesebuch für Gelehrte und Ungelehrte (Journal of Experiential Psychology, as reading for scholars and laymen) was one of the first Germanophone journals of psychology. His works include:

Blunt oder der Gast, 1781
Beiträge zur Philosophie des Lebens aus dem Tagebuch eines Freimäurers, 1780
Magazin zur Erfahrungsseelenkunde als ein Lesebuch für Gelehrte und Ungelehrte. 1783–1793
Reisen eines Deutschen in England im Jahre 1782, 1783. English: Journeys of a German in England in 1782
Ideal einer vollkommnen Zeitung, 1784
Anton Reiser (Part 1), 1785
Andreas Hartknopf, Eine Allegorie, 1785
Anton Reiser (Parts 2 and 3), 1786
Denkwürdigkeiten, aufgezeichnet zur Beförderung des Edlen und Schönen, 1786
Versuch einer deutschen Prosodie, 1786
Versuch einer kleinen praktischen Kinderlogik, 1786
Fragmente aus dem Tagebuche eines Geistersehers, 1787
Über die bildende Nachahmung des Schönen, 1788
Italien und Deutschland, 1789
Monats-Schrift der Akademie der Künste und Mechanischen Wissenschaften zu Berlin, 1789
Über eine Schrift des Herrn Schulrath Campe, und über die Rechte des Schriftstellers und Buchhändlers, 1789
Andreas Hartknopfs Predigerjahre, 1790
Anton Reiser (Part 4), 1790
Neues ABC-Buch, 1790
Annalen der Akademie der Künste und Mechanischen Wissenschaften, 1791
Anthusa oder Roms Alterthümer, 1791
Götterlehre oder Mythologische Dichtungen der Alten, 1791
Grundlinien zu meinen Vorlesungen über den Styl, 1791
Italienische Sprachlehre für die Deutschen, 1791
Über die Vereinfachung der menschlichen Kenntnisse, 1791
Lesebuch für Kinder, 1792
Mythologischer Almanach für Damen, 1792
Reisen eines Deutschen in Italien in den Jahren 1786 bis 1788, 1792
Vom richtigen deutschen Ausdruck, 1792
Allgemeiner deutscher Briefsteller, 1793
Die große Loge oder der Freimaurer mit Waage und Senkblei, 1793
Grammatisches Wörterbuch (4 vols. 1793–1800)
Mythologisches Wörterbuch zum Gebrauch für Schulen, 1793
Reisen eines Deutschen in Italien in den Jahren 1786 bis 1788, 1793
Vorbegriffe zu einer Theorie der Ornamente, 1793
Vorlesungen über den Styl (Part 1), 1793
Die neue Cecilia, (1793, fragment)

References

Sources 
 Apel, Kim.  Predigten in der Literatur: homiletische Erkundungen bei Karl Philipp Moritz. Praktische Theologie in Geschichte und Gegenwart (Tuebingen: Mohr Siebeck, 2009).

External links 

 
 
 Berlin-Brandenburg Academy of Sciences Moritz Critical Edition
Das Magazin zur Erfahrungsseelenkunde Digital Edition.

1756 births
1793 deaths
People from Hamelin

People from the Electorate of Hanover
Members of the Prussian Academy of Sciences
Milliners
German male writers